Lauren Emma Drummond (born 23 December 1987) is an English actress. She is best known for her roles as Mika Grainger in the BBC One school-based drama series Waterloo Road (2006–2008) and Chantelle Lane in the BBC One medical drama series Holby City (2011–2013, 2016).

Education

Drummond was born and brought up in Cheadle Hulme in Stockport and attended Bramhall High School before completing a Performing Arts Course at Mid Cheshire College. She attended the college at the same time as Adam Thomas, who played Donte Charles in Waterloo Road.

Career

Drummond played the role of Mika Grainger in the BBC school-based drama series Waterloo Road from its inception on 9 March 2006. Her last appearance was at the end of series 3 in March 2008.

She has made other TV appearances, with roles on shows including Coronation Street, Doctors and Grange Hill. In 2005, she won two roles – Mika Grainger in Waterloo Road and Jane Black in Heartbeat. However, Drummond left Heartbeat in early 2006 after being written out. On 20 May 2008, she appeared in an episode of Holby City, playing diabetic teenager Hannah Sharpe.

In 2008, Drummond appeared in an episode of Harley Street, as Lisa Foster. Drummond starred as Princess Mika in a modern version of the pantomime, Jack and the Beanstalk, at The Sands Centre in Carlisle over Christmas 2008. She then starred in a new stage production of Billy Liar. She has been filming in Scarborough for her role as Faye in The Royal.

In 2009, she played the role of Bree in Casualty. In April 2010, she appeared in BBC soap opera Doctors.

In 2011, she joined the cast of Holby City as new nurse Chantelle Lane, but departed the show in November 2013. She had previously appeared as a one-off character, Hannah Sharpe, back in 2008. Drummond returned in June 2016 for one episode as a farewell to character Arthur Digby.

In 2014, she toured the UK in a production of J.B. Priestley’s classic play Dangerous Corner.

Filmography

Television

References

External links 
 

English television actresses
1987 births
Living people
People from Cheadle Hulme
Actresses from Greater Manchester
People educated at Bramhall High School
21st-century English actresses